This list of the prehistoric life of Pennsylvania contains the various prehistoric life-forms whose fossilized remains have been reported from within the US state of Pennsylvania.

Precambrian
The Paleobiology Database records no known occurrences of Precambrian fossils in Pennsylvania.

Paleozoic

Selected Paleozoic taxa of Pennsylvania

 †Acidaspis
 †Agnostus
 †Alethopteris
 †Amphiscapha
  †Anomalocaris
 †Aphthoroblattina
 †Archaeopteris
 †Archaeopteris halliana
 †Archaeopteris macilenta
 †Archimylacris
 †Asaphiscus
 †Athyris
 †Athyris spiriferoides
 †Atrypa
 †Atrypa reticularis
 †Aviculopecten
 †Aviculopecten occidentalis
 †Barinophyton
 †Bathyuriscus
 †Bellerophon
 †Bembexia
 †Beyrichoceratoides
 †Blattoidea
 †Bonneterrina
  †Bothriolepis
 †Byronia
 †Callixylon
 †Camarotoechia
  †Camptostroma
 †Cavusgnathus
 †Ceramopora
 †Ceratopsis
 †Chancelloria
 †Chancia
 †Chonetes
 †Cincinnetina
 †Cincinnetina multisecta
 †Cleiothyridina
 †Climacograptus
  †Coccosteus
 †Coelacanthus
 †Composita
 †Composita subtilita
 †Conotheca
 †Coosella
 †Coosia
 †Cordaites
 †Cornulites
 †Cornulites flexuosus
 †Craniops
 †Crepicephalus
 †Ctenerpeton – type locality for genus
 †Ctenopterus
 †Cyclonema
  †Cyclopteris
 †Cypricardinia
 †Cypricardinia indenta
 †Cyrtospirifer
 †Dawsonia
 †Deckera
 †Densignathus – type locality for genus
  †Diplocaulus – or unidentified comparable form
 †Diploceraspis
 †Diploceraspis burkei
 †Diplograptus
  †Edaphosaurus
 †Edmondia
 †Eldredgeops
 †Eldredgeops rana
 †Elita
 †Elrathia
 †Elrathina
 †Endolobus
 †Eoagnostus
 †Erettopterus
 †Eryops
 †Esmeraldina
 †Euomphalus
  †Favosites
 †Favosites niagarensis
 †Fenestella
 †Ganorhynchus
 †Genevievella
 †Glaukerpeton – type locality for genus
 †Glyptocrinus
 †Gnathodus
 †Gravicalymene
 †Greenops
 †Hallipterus
 †Hardieopterus
 †Hazelia
 †Helcionella
 †Hexactinellid
 †Hindeodus
  †Holonema
 †Holopea
 †Holoptychius
 †Holoptychus
 †Hughmilleria
 †Hymenocaris
  †Hynerpeton – type locality for genus
 †Hynerpeton bassetti – type locality for species
 †Hyolithellus
 †Hyolithes
 †Hyolithid
 †Indiana – tentative report
 †Iocrinus
 †Irvingella
  †Isodectes
  †Isotelus
 †Isotelus gigas
 †Kiaeropterus
 †Kingstonia
 †Kladognathus
 †Kootenia
  †Kutorgina
 †Lancastria
 †Lepidostrobus
 †Leptomitus
 Lingula
 †Lingulella
 †Llanoaspidella – type locality for genus
 †Llanoaspis – tentative report
 †Lonchocephalus
  †Lysorophus
 †Margaretia
 †Martinia
 †Megalograptus – tentative report
 †Megamolgophis
 †Metacoceras
 †Michelinoceras
 †Micromitra
 †Mimagoniatites – tentative report
 †Mucrospirifer
 †Mucrospirifer mucronatus
 †Nanahughmilleria
 †Naticopsis
  †Neospirifer
 †Neospirifer cameratus
  †Neuropteris
 †Nisusia
 Nucula
 †Ogygopsis
 †Olenellus
 †Olenoides
 †Olenoides serratus
  †Orthacanthus
 †Orthoceras
 †Orthotheca
 †Oryctocephalus
  †Osteolepis
 †Oulodus
 †Ozarkodina
 †Paedeumias
 †Pagetia
 †Paladin
 †Panenka
 †Parahughmilleria
 †Paraspirifer
 †Paterina
 †Pelagiella
 †Pemphigaspis
 †Pentremites
 †Peronopsis
 †Petalodus
  †Phacops
 Pinna
 †Platyceras
 †Pleurodictyum
 †Proetus
 †Protobarinophyton
 †Protocaris
 †Protospongia – tentative report
 †Pugnax
 †Quasillites
 †Rhinocarcinosoma
 †Rhodea
 †Ribeiria
 †Ruedemannipterus
 †Salterella
  †Sauripterus
 †Sauripterus taylori
 †Schaefferia (Paleozoic plant) – or unidentified comparable form
 †Schizodiscus
 †Sciadophyton
 †Selkirkia
 †Sidneyia
  †Sigillaria
 †Solenochilus
 †Sowerbyella
 †Spathognathodus
 †Spirifer
 †Spyroceras
 †Strophomena
 †Taeniocrada
 †Tentaculites
  †Tetraxylopteris
 †Titusvillia – type locality for genus
 †Triarthrus
 †Tricrepicephalus
 †Trimerus
 †Tubulella
 †Tuzoia
 †Urasterella
 †Vinella
 †Wanneria
 †Wilkingia
 †Worthenia
 †Yochelcionella

Mesozoic

 †Anchisauripus
 †Anchisauripus gwyneddensis – type locality for species
 †Anchisauripus poolei – type locality for species
 †Anchisauripus sillimani
  †Anomoepus
 †Anomoepus gracillimus
 †Apatopus
 †Atreipus
 †Atreipus milfordensis
 †Batrachopus
 †Batrachopus gracilis
 †Belodon
 †Belodon priscus
 †Brachychirotherium
 †Brontozoum
 †Brontozoum sillimanium
 †Calamops – type locality for genus
 †Calamops paludosus – type locality for species
  †Chirotherium
 †Chirotherium lulli
 †Chirotherium parvum
 †Clepsysaurus – type locality for genus
 †Clepsysaurus pennsylvanicus – type locality for species
 †Clepsysaurus veatleianus
 †Dinophyton
 †Diplurus
 †Diplurus longicaudatus
  †Dipterus
 †Dipterus redfieldi
 †Eubrontes
 †Eubrontes giganteus
 †Grallator
 †Grallator cuneatus
 †Grallator tenuis
 †Gwyneddichnium – type locality for genus
 †Gwyneddichnium majore – type locality for species
 †Gwyneddosaurus – type locality for genus
 †Gwyneddosaurus erici – type locality for species
 †Koskinonodon
 †Koskinonodon perfectus
  †Mastodonsaurus
 †Mastodonsaurus durus – type locality for species
 †Orthodactylus
 †Orthodactylus howelli – type locality for species
  †Otozoum – tentative report
 †Otozoum minus
 †Pagiophyllum
 †Palaeoctonus
 †Palaeoctonus appalachianus
 †Palaeosaurus
 †Palaeosaurus fraserianus – type locality for species
 †Platypterna
 †Platypterna lockatong – type locality for species
 †Pterodactylus
 †Pterodactylus longispinis – type locality for species
  †Revueltosaurus
 †Rhynchosauroides
 †Rhynchosauroides brunswickii
 †Rhynchosauroides hyperbates
  †Rutiodon
 †Rutiodon carolinensis
 †Scoyenia
 †Sphodrosaurus – type locality for genus
 †Sphodrosaurus pennsylvanicus – type locality for species
 †Suchoprion
 †Suchoprion aulacodus
 †Suchoprion cyphodon
 †Synorichthys
 †Turseodus

Cenozoic

 Acidota
 †Acidota crenata
 †Acidota quadrata
  Aegialia
 Agonum
 †Agonum affine
 †Agonum consimile
 †Agonum gratiosum
 †Agonum quinquepunctatum
 †Agonum simile
 Amara
 Apalone
  †Apalone mutica – tentative report
 Aphodius
 †Aphodius precursor – type locality for species
 Apion
  †Arctodus
 †Arctodus pristinus – type locality for species
 Arpedium
 †Arpedium cribratum
 †Ateuchus – tentative report
 Bembidion
 †Bembidion anguliferum group informal
 †Bembidion fortestriatum
 †Bembidion frontale
 †Bembidion incertum group informal
 †Bembidion morulum
 †Bembidion mutatum
 †Bembidion pseudocautum
 †Bembidion versicolor – or unidentified comparable form
 Blarina
  †Blarina brevicauda – type locality for species
 †Blarina carolinensis
 Bledius
 Blethisa
 †Blethisa catenaria
 Boreaphilus
 †Boreaphilus henningianus
 †Brachyprotoma
 †Brachyprotoma obtusata – type locality for species
 Bufo
 †Bufo americanus
 Canis
 †Canis armbrusteri
  †Canis dirus
 Carabus
 †Carabus maeander
 †Cariacus
 †Cariacus laevicornis – type locality for species
 Carphoborus
 †Carphoborus andersoni
 Castor
 †Castor canadensis
  †Castoroides
 †Castoroides ohioensis
 Catops
  †Cervalces
 Chlaenius
 †Chlaenius punctulatus – type locality for species
 Colinus
 †Colinus virginianus
 Coluber
 †Coluber acuminatus – type locality for species
 †Coluber constrictor
 Colymbetes
  Crocuta
 †Crocuta inexpectatus – type locality for species
 Crotalus
 †Crotalus horridus
 Curimopsis
 †Curimopsis moosilauke – or unidentified comparable form
 †Cychrus
 †Cychrus minor – type locality for species
 †Cychrus wheatleyi – type locality for species
 Cymindis
 †Cymindis aurora – type locality for species
 †Cymindis cribricollis
 Cytilus
 †Cytilus alternatus
  Diacheila
 †Diacheila arctica
 Dicaelus
 †Dicaelus alutaceus – type locality for species
 Donacia
 Dyschirius
 †Dyschirius integer group informal
 †Dyschirius melancholicus
 Elaphe
 †Elaphe vulpina
 Elaphrus
 †Elaphrus americanus
 †Elaphrus clairvillei
 †Elaphrus lapponicus
 Emydoidea
  †Emydoidea blandingii
 Enochrus
 Equus
 †Equus complicatus
 †Equus pectinatus
 Erethizon
  †Erethizon dorsatum
 Eucnecosum
 †Eucnecosum brunnescens
 Glyptemys
 †Glyptemys insculpta
 Gulo
  †Gulo gulo
 Gymnusa
 Harpalus
 Helophorus
 †Helophorus sempervarians
 †Helophorus tuberculatus
 †Hesperotestudo
 †Hesperotestudo percrassa – type locality for species
  Heterodon
 †Heterodon platyrhinos
 Holoboreaphilus
 †Holoboreaphilus nordenskioldi
 Homo
 †Homo sapiens
 Hydraena
 Hydroporus
 Hyla
  †Hyla crucifer
 Lampropeltis
 †Lampropeltis triangulum
 Lasiopodomys – tentative report
 Lesteva
 †Lesteva pallipes
 Lontra
 †Lontra canadensis
 Loricera
 †Loricera pilicornis
 Lynx
 †Lynx calcaratus – type locality for species
 †Mammut
 †Mammut americanum
 †Mammuthus
  †Mammuthus primigenius
 Mantura
 Marmota
 †Marmota monax – or unidentified comparable form
  †Megalonyx
 †Megalonyx wheatleyi
 Meleagris
 †Meleagris gallopavo
 Mephitis
 †Mephitis mephitis
 Microedus
 †Microedus austinianus
 Microtus
 †Microtus guildayi – or unidentified comparable form
  †Miracinonyx
 †Miracinonyx inexpectatus – or unidentified comparable form
 Mustela
 Mycetoporus
  †Mylohyus
 †Mylohyus fossilis
 Myotis
 Napaeozapus
 †Napaeozapus insignis
 Natrix
  Neofiber
 †Neofiber diluvianus – type locality for species
 Nerodia
 †Nerodia sipedon
 Nitidotachinus
 †Nitidotachinus tachyporoides
 Notaris
 †Notaris aethiops
 Notiophilus
 Ochthebius
 Odocoileus
  †Odocoileus virginianus
 Olophrum
 †Olophrum boreale
 †Olophrum consimile
 †Olophrum latum
 †Olophrum rotundicolle
  Ondatra
 †Ondatra idahoensis – type locality for species
 Opheodrys
 †Opheodrys vernalis
 †Osmotherium – type locality for genus
 †Osmotherium spelaeum – type locality for species
 Oxytelus
 Panthera
  †Panthera onca
  †Paramylodon
 †Paramylodon harlani – tentative report
 Parascalops
 †Parascalops breweri
 Patrobus
 †Patrobus foveocollis
 †Patrobus septentrionis
 †Patrobus stygicus
 Pekania
 †Pekania diluviana
 Pelenomus
 Peromyscus
 †Peromyscus leucopus – tentative report
 †Phanaeus
 †Phanaeus antiquus – type locality for species
 Philonthus
 Phloeotribus
 †Phloeotribus piceae
 Pitymys
 †Pitymys cumberlandensis – or unidentified comparable form
 Pityophthorus
  †Platygonus
 †Platygonus vetus – type locality for species
 Platynus
 †Platynus hypolithos
 Podabrus
 Polygraphus
 †Polygraphus rufipennis
 Pterostichus
 †Pterostichus laevigatus – type locality for species
 †Pterostichus patruelis
 †Pterostichus punctatissimus
 Pycnoglypta
 †Pycnoglypta aptera
 †Pycnoglypta lurida
 Quedius
 †Rana
  †Rana pipiens – or unidentified comparable form
  Scalopus
 Simplocaria
  †Smilodon
 †Smilodon gracilis – type locality for species
 Sorex
 Sphaeroderus
 †Sphaeroderus nitidicollis – or unidentified comparable form
 Stenus
 Stereocerus
 †Stereocerus haematopus
 Sylvilagus
 †Sylvilagus floridanus
 Synaptomys
 †Synaptomys cooperi
 Tachinus
 †Tachinus luridus
 Tamias
 †Tamias striatus – or unidentified comparable form
  Tapirus
 †Tapirus haysii
 †Tapirus veroensis
 Taxidea
  †Taxidea taxus
 Terrapene
 †Terrapene carolina
 Thamnophis
 Thanatophilus
 Thomomys
 †Thomomys potomacensis
 Trechus
 †Trechus crassiscapus
 †Uncia
 †Uncia mercerii – type locality for species
 Urocyon
  †Urocyon cinereoargenteus
 Ursus
 †Ursus americanus
 Vulpes
 Zapus
 †Zapus hudsonius

References
 

Pennsylvania
Paleontology in Pennsylvania